Philippe Jones Lhuillier  (born July 23, 1945) is a Filipino diplomat, businessman and philanthropist. He is the current Philippine ambassador to Spain. From 1999 to 2010, he was the ambassador to Italy and the chairman of the Philippine’s largest pawnshop chain, Cebuana Lhuillier Pawnshop. He was born to the late Henry Lhuillier and the late Angelita Escaño Jones.

Education
Philippe graduated with a bachelor of science degree in management from De La Salle University, Manila and received a diploma in gemology from the International Gemological Institute of Antwerp in 1970 and the Gemological Institute of America in 1971.

Career
Before being assigned to Portugal, Lhuillier was the Philippine ambassador to Italy in 1999, Albania in 2000, and San Marino in 2003 where he was the first Philippine ambassador to that country. His terms of office in these countries ended in January 2010.

Awards and recognition
Lhuillier receive numerous awards for his work. He was awarded by the government of the Republic of Italy with the Ordine Della Stella Della Solidarieta Italiana Award for his significant achievement in fostering goodwill between Italy and the Philippines. The order is bestowed through a decree by Italy’s President through the recommendation of the Ministry of Foreign Affairs. It is the highest Italian award given to foreigners as well as Italians living abroad.  Amb. Lhuillier was conferred the Order of Rajah Humabon by Cebu City on its 73rd Charter Anniversary on February 24, 2010 for promoting economic development and tourism.  In 2008, he was unanimously selected as one of the Twenty Outstanding Filipinos Abroad (TOFA) for his promoting the image of Filipinos while serving his post as Philippine ambassador to Italy, Albania and San Marino.  De la Salle University awarded him the Distinguished La Sallian Award for his record as Ambassador to Italy and his  assistance to the Filipino OFWs. The University of the Philippines also honored him by naming one of its lecture rooms as Ambassador Philippe J. Lhuillier Lecture Room.  On April 16, 2010, Saint Louis University conferred on Ambassador Philippe J. Lhuillier the degree of Doctor of Humanities, honoris causa. On November 24, 2018, Lhillier was conferred the Order of the Knights of Rizal with the rank of Knight Commander of Rizal (KCR) at the Embassy of the Philippines in Madrid, Spain.

Personal life
Philippe is married to Edna Villanueva Diago Lhuillier daughter of Sugar Planter Vicente Diago and Marina Pinili Villanueva of Bais, Negros Oriental. They have two sons, Jean Henri Lhuillier and Philippe Andre D. Lhuillier, and five daughters, Christine Lhuillier-Limjoco, Jacqueline Lhuillier-Hess, Angelique Lhuillier-Miranda, Camille Lhuillier-Albani, and Madeleine D. Lhuillier.

References

Bibliography
Lhuillier, Philippe Jones (2009). "Bayang Magiliw: Finding Bel Paese: Philippine-Italian Relations". Great Minds Media.
Villavicencio, Boysie. (CPPI's 54th Anniversary". Malaya. 20 May 2010. http://www.malaya.com.ph/05202010/livboysie.html. 8 August 2011
Salientes-Narisma, Corrie. "At 65, He's Starting Again." Inquirer.net. 26 June 2010. http://services.inquirer.net/print/print.php?article_id=20100626-277724. 8 August 2011
https://web.archive.org/web/20110819213954/http://www.cebuanalhuillier.com/about-us.aspx

1945 births
Living people
20th-century Filipino businesspeople
Filipino diplomats
Philippe
De La Salle University alumni
Filipino people of French descent
Businesspeople from Cebu
21st-century Filipino businesspeople